Season 2010–11 will see Clyde compete in the Scottish Third Division following relegation from the Scottish Second Division.

Notable events
May: Clyde begin to shape their squad for life in the Third Division, with goalkeeper Scott Findlay, midfielder Marvyn Wilson and winger Conn Boyle being told their contracts will not be renewed. Connor Cassidy and Jay Lang are also released, whilst Latvian duo Dmitrijs Borisovs and Aleksandrs Gramovics return home after their contracts expire. Jordan Allan, Neil McGowan, Ally Park, Connor Stevenson and John Stewart  all sign new contracts for the forthcoming season, but Alan Lithgow, Kevin Higgins and Steven Howarth reject new deals and leave the club. Willie Sawyers re-signs on a new one-year deal after original contract discussions had broken down. Goalkeeper Calum Reidford and midfielder Willie McLachlan reject new contract offers and therefore leave the club. The club strengthen their squad by bringing in Haydn Cochrane, Murray Henderson, Graham Girvan, Marc McCusker and JC Hutchinson.
June: John Sweeney becomes Clyde's sixth new signing after signing on from Pollok.  Pollok striker Brian Dingwall has been rumoured to be joining the squad for Pre-Season training.
August: Steven Howarth joins Motherwell for an undisclosed compensation sum on 31 August 2010.

Squad

Results
Scores are shown Clyde first.

Player statistics

Overall

League table

Transfers

In

Out

Notes

Clyde F.C. seasons
Clyde